Aalborghus Gymnasium is an upper secondary school in the city of Aalborg, in North Jutland in Denmark. It offers both the traditional three-year programme and also the two-year Higher Preparatory Examination (HF) programme.  The subjects taught at the school range from Religion and Music to Spanish and Natural Geography.  Aalborghus Gymnasium attempts to focus on the musical and creative side of students as well as taking an international perspective on issues. Students begin their studies at Aalborghus by selecting a stream of studies.  Each stream has two or three subjects that are the focus of the studies.  English/Social Studies is one example of a stream a student can select.

Footnotes

External links
 Aalborghus Gymnasium 

Gymnasiums in Denmark
Education in Aalborg